Lynn Paul King (November 28, 1907 – May 11, 1972) was a Major League Baseball player from  to  and in . King was born in Villisca, Iowa and died in Atlantic, Iowa. King attended Drake University in Des Moines, Iowa, where he letter in football, basketball, and baseball. The was the starting quarterbacks for the Drake Bulldogs from 1928 to 1930 and captain of the 1930 Drake Bulldogs football team.

References

External links
, or Retrosheet

1907 births
1972 deaths
American football quarterbacks
Columbus Red Birds players
Drake Bulldogs baseball players
Drake Bulldogs football players
Drake Bulldogs men's basketball players
Houston Buffaloes players
Kansas City Blues (baseball) players
Major League Baseball center fielders
Minor league baseball managers
Sacramento Solons players
Seattle Rainiers players
Sioux Falls Canaries managers
St. Louis Cardinals players
United States Army Air Forces personnel of World War II
People from Atlantic, Iowa
People from Montgomery County, Iowa
Players of American football from Iowa
Baseball players from Iowa
Basketball players from Iowa